Pust Forushan (also Romanized as Pūst Forūshān; also known as Pūst Forūsh and Pīsh Forūsh) is a village in Zeberkhan Rural District, Zeberkhan District, Nishapur County, Razavi Khorasan Province, Iran. At the 2006 census, its population was 752, in 200 families.

References 

Populated places in Nishapur County